The Chachao Formation is a geological formation in the Mendoza Province in northern Patagonian Argentina. It is Valanginian in age and is predominantly marine, being deposited at a time of marine transgression in the Neuquén Basin, and predominantly consists of carbonate rocks.

The formation belongs to the Mendoza Group, sediments deposited on the Mendoza Shelf. The formation overlies the Vaca Muerta and is overlain by the Agrio Formation.

Description 
A typical feature of the Chachao Formation is the dominance of oysters, many of them quite large e.g. Aetostreon latissimun, and others small, e.g. Ceratostreon minos. Different kinds of semi-infaunal soft bottom dwellers and swimming bivalves were recognized. Additional forms are represented by gastropods, ammonites (Olcostephanus curacoensis), and ichnofossils such as Thalassinoides sp. Serpulids are represented by the colonial Sarcinella sp., and the solitary form Parsimonia sp. The highly diverse fauna of the analyzed succession, made up with numerous stenohaline elements such as echinoderm, bryozoa, ammonite as well as serpulids and typical marine pelecypods indicate a fully marine environment.

Fossil content 
The formation has provided the following fossils:
 Decapods
 Callianassa aff. peruviana
 Ammonites
 Groebericeras bifrons
 Olcostephanus curacoensis
 Polychaeta
 Parsimonia sp.
 Sarcinella occidentalis
 Bivalves
 Exogyra caudoni
 Cucullaea sp.
 Exogyra (Aetostreon)
 Amphidonte (Ceratostreon)
 Eriphyla sp.
 Myoconcha sp.
 Pinna sp.
 Pecten sp.
 Ptychomya sp.
 Trigonia sp.
 Ichnofossils
 Thalassinoides sp.

References

Bibliography 
 
 
 
 
 

Geologic formations of Argentina
Lower Cretaceous Series of South America
Cretaceous Argentina
Valanginian Stage
Limestone formations
Mudstone formations
Open marine deposits
Shallow marine deposits
Formations
Fossiliferous stratigraphic units of South America
Paleontology in Argentina
Geology of Mendoza Province